The Mackenzie Large Igneous Province (MLIP) is a major Mesoproterozoic large igneous province of the southwestern, western and northwestern Canadian Shield in Canada. It consists of a group of related igneous rocks that were formed during a massive igneous event starting about 1,270 million years ago. The large igneous province extends from the Arctic in Nunavut to near the Great Lakes in Northwestern Ontario where it meets with the smaller Matachewan dike swarm. Included in the Mackenzie Large Igneous Province are the large Muskox layered intrusion, the Coppermine River flood basalt sequence and the massive northwesterly trending Mackenzie dike swarm.

As a large igneous province, it is an extremely large area of related igneous rocks that were emplaced over an extremely short geological time span. The igneous rocks comprising the Mackenzie Large Igneous Province originated from processes not associated with normal plate tectonics and seafloor spreading. It is one of the several large igneous provinces scattered throughout the Canadian landscape, which can be thousands of kilometres in volume and area. The Mackenzie Large Igneous Province is one of the world's largest Proterozoic magmatic provinces, as well as one of the most well-preserved continental flood basalt terrains on Earth. Igneous rocks of the Mackenzie Large Igneous Province are generally mafic in composition, including basalt and gabbro.

Even though the Mackenzie Large Igneous Province is classified as a large igneous province like other extremely large accumulations of igneous rocks on Earth, it is much larger than large igneous province standards. However, the Mackenzie dike swarm itself occupies an area of at least , making the Mackenzie Large Igneous Province larger than the Ontong Java Plateau (in the southwestern Pacific Ocean) and the U.S. state of Alaska.

Geology

Origins
Like most large igneous provinces, the Mackenzie Large Igneous Province has its origins in a mantle plume—an upwelling zone of abnormally hot rock within the Earth's mantle. As the head of the Mackenzie plume encountered the Earth's lithosphere, it spread out and melted catastrophically to form large volumes of basaltic magma. This resulted in the creation of a stationary volcanic zone west of Victoria Island that experienced considerable volcanism known as the Mackenzie hotspot. Evidence for the Mackenzie hotspot include the existence of the giant mafic Mackenzie dike swarm because of its fanning pattern adjacent to the Muskox intrusion.

This calculation is based on the analysis of magmatic fabric in the Mackenzie dike swarm, which shows that magma flow was only vertical close to the middle of the Mackenzie plume and only subhorizontal away from the plume. However, if subhorizontal flow is a result of dike ascent to a level of impartial lightness in the Earth's crust, it would not be related to the size of the Mackenzie plume. Instead, the analysis of dike swarm geometry could possibly maintain evidence for the smallest diameter of the Mackenzie plume. The outer limit separating the zone of fanning dike geometry and subparallel dikes might be suggestive of the smallest diameter for the Mackenzie plume because it is not probable that the stress related to a magmatic zone has consequence over a region that is lesser than the Mackenzie plume, which created the feature. Uranium-lead dating of certain Mackenzie dikes from an array of distances from an assigned focal point give an age of  million years. This indicates that the Mackenzie hotspot essentially emplaced the Mackenzie Large Igneous Province as a whole throughout the associated landscape. The associated Mackenzie plume is consistent with mantle plumes that have deep origins within the Earth's mantle.

The Mackenzie hotspot is interpreted to have been similar to the early volcanism of the Yellowstone hotspot. Both hotspots produced massive qualities of basaltic lava flows that were identical with the formation of dike swarms during a short period of time at the beginning of mantle plume volcanism. It is estimated that the majority of volcanism that formed the Mackenzie Large Igneous Province took place for no more than two million years, and subsequent volcanism is unknown. However, the younger and smaller Franklin Large Igneous Province just to the northeast is considered to have been formed by a similar mantle plume between 727 and 721 million years ago. The short time span of two million years for magma emplacement in the Mackenzie Large Igneous Province is also present for the Yellowstone hotspot.

Extensional forces

At the beginning of the Mackenzie magmatic event, the Mackenzie hotspot collided with lithosphere that was already in an extensional regime that allowed rifting to occur. Passive rifting has been interpreted as the mechanism that produced the opening of the former Poseidon Ocean, the geometry of which would have been partly controlled by dike swarm geometry. Fahrig (1987) proposed that the Mackenzie plume impact resulted in the emplacement of a triple junction that had a large mafic dike swarm on every rift arm. Two of the first arms formed the Poseidon Ocean basin and the third arm failed thus forming an aulacogen. This tectonic setting suggestion can be comparable with the early volcano-tectonic evolution of the Yellowstone hotspot, which developed two arms instead of three, followed by failure of both arms. At the Mackenzie hotspot, rifting is considered to have been passive and to have taken place in the crust above the hotspot that should have been weakened by the Mackenzie plume. Crustal uplift may have also provided stresses contributing to rifting.

The Lake Superior portion of the Midcontinent Rift System is bounded on the south by pre-existing continental faults that had substantial right-lateral movement before the formation of the Midcontinent Rift System. This period of rifting was a large event for copper mineralization, and the rifting event later deceased when the Grenville orogeny collision occurred.

Magmatic history
The massive extent of the Mackenzie Large Igneous Province contains a number of magmatic features that were formed during the extensive Mackenzie magmatic event. This includes flood basalts, layered intrusions, sills and dikes, which are widespread throughout the large igneous province.

Placement of the Muskox intrusion

Adjacent to McGregor Lake in western Nunavut lies the massive Muskox intrusion. It remains as one of the largest and most studied layered intrusions on Earth, as well as one of the most valuable from an economic perspective. The intrusion represents the oldest igneous formation of the Mackenzie magmatic event, having formed between 1,905 and 1,155 million years ago.

The Muskox intrusion can be separated into three sections, including an olivine gabbro feeder dike to the intrusion, another contact margin zone, and an upper layered series. Because of different levels of erosion and outcroppings of the Muskox intrusion at higher structural levels, north of the Coppermine River the overlying margin zone and layered series covers the feeder dike section. The layering series dips gently north as do the overlying Coppermine flood basalts. Weathering of the Muskox dipping sequence has exposed a cross-section through the entire dipping sequence, starting with the Coppermine flood basalts in the north above the roof of the magma chamber, down through the igneous layering of the Muskox intrusion and into the keel region of the intrusion and its intersection with the olivine gabbro feeder dike that forms the southernmost sector. The margin zone characterizes the western and eastern outer limits of the intrusion.

Construction of the Mackenzie dike swarm
Widespread throughout the Mackenzie Large Igneous Province is the  Mackenzie dike swarm. The Mackenzie dike swarm was emplaced into older metamorphic and igneous rocks of the Canadian Shield about 1,200 million years ago.

The Mackenzie dike swarm is the largest dike swarm known on Earth and is one of the several dike swarms found throughout the Canadian Shield. Mafic dikes cut Archean and Proterozoic rocks of the Canadian Shield, including those in the Athabasca Basin in Saskatchewan, the Thelon Basin in Nunavut and the Baker Lake Basin in the Northwest Territories. The mafic dikes display evidence that the unmetamorphosed basin-fill sequence was deposited before the Mackenzie dikes were intruded into the associated basins. When the giant Mackenzie dike swarm intruded into the Canadian Shield, it partly uplifted and intruded the Slave craton in the Northwest Territories and Nunavut. This was the last major event to affect the core of the Slave craton, although later on some younger mafic magmatism registered along its boundaries. This includes the magmatic events that formed the 723 million year old Franklin Large Igneous Province and the 780 million year old Hottah gabbro sheets. Since the Mackenzie dike swarm intruded the Slave craton, the craton has been repeatedly submerged under seas.

In northern Yukon, the 1,265 to 1,269 million year old Bear River dikes are interpreted to represent the western extension of the Mackenzie dike swarm. They display geologic similarities with the Mackenzie dike swarm and the Coppermine River flood basalts, and are therefore regarded as products of the Mackenzie plume. The dikes intrude through Early Proterozoic sedimentary strata of the Wernecke Supergroup, some of which exist as separate intrusions while others occur in swarms of up to eight dikes. Medium to fine grained diorite and gabbro comprise the Bear River dikes and are occasionally altered by metamorphism to form greenschist. Apart from two dikes that display differentiation, such as containing weak penetrative foliation of unknown age and origin and being cross-cut by undated hematitic veins, the Bear River dikes are interpreted to have formed during a single magmatic phase.

Flood basalts
Between 1,200 and 740 million years ago, a series of flood basalt eruptions took place. At the northern portion of the Mackenzie Large Igneous Province, vast volumes of basaltic lava paved over a large area of the northwestern Canadian Shield. This extensive area of flood basalt lava flows has been termed the Coppermine River flood basalts hence given the location of the flood basalt sequence. This makes the Coppermine River flood basalts one of the largest flood basalt events ever to appear on the North American continent, as well as on Earth.

The Coppermine River flood basalts were extruded shortly after a period of crustal uplift that later resulted in a short period of collapse in the associated landscape. This sudden uplift was likely caused by rising magma of the Mackenzie plume, which later resulted in the appearance of the Mackenzie hotspot. The early Muskox intrusion is considered to have originally been a sill-shaped magma reservoir for the overlying Coppermine River flood basalts during their formation.

Further to the northeast, the Nauyat Formation flood basalts on northwestern Baffin Island of Nunavut were erupted on a smaller scale about 900 million years ago. They appear green in colour and contain the magnesium iron silicate mineral olivine. Minor pillow lavas also exist in the Ekalulia flood basalts.

Mineralization
Heavy platinum group elements and copper mineralization exists in the basal margin of the Muskox intrusion. Research operated by Muskox Minerals Corp. proclaims that this extensive layered intrusion has the possibility to evolve into a massive expected source of copper, nickel and platinum group metals. The expected mineralization potential for the Muskox intrusion is supported as a result of its strong similarities to the Noril'sk-Talnakh intrusions in Siberia where the richest orebodies exist on Earth. Because the Muskox intrusion has strong similarities to the Noril'sk-Talnakh area in Siberia, a number of mineral explorations have taken place. The first mineral exploration of the Muskox intrusion occurred during the 1950s when surface prospecting began by the International Nickel Company of Canada, which is now known as Vale Inco. In the 1980s, many small companies with little financing and fragmented claim blocks attended sampling and a number of drilling operations on outcroppings of the Muskox intrusion that contained platinum group elements.

Exposed portions of the feeder dike south of the Coppermine River comprise bodies of large semi-massive and disseminated copper-nickel sulfides rich in platinum group metals. This is the location where casual mineral exploration companies searched the Muskox intrusion in the past.

See also
Timeline of volcanism on Earth
Volcanology of Canada
Volcanology of Eastern Canada
Volcanology of Northern Canada
Volcanology of Western Canada

References

 
Plate tectonics
Mesoproterozoic volcanism
Hotspot volcanism
Rift volcanism
Historical geology
Economic geology